Tortricopsis pyroptis is a moth of the family Oecophoridae. It is found in Australia.

The larvae feed on Exocarpos, Pinus radiata, Cupressus and dead phyllodes of Acacia.

Oecophoridae